The United States ambassador to Tuvalu is the official representative of the government of the United States to the government of Tuvalu. The ambassador is concurrently the ambassador to Fiji, Kiribati, Nauru, and Tonga, while residing in Suva, Fiji.

Ambassadors

See also
Tuvalu – United States relations
Foreign relations of Tuvalu
Ambassadors of the United States

References
United States Department of State: Background notes on Tuvalu

External links
 United States Department of State: Chiefs of Mission for Tuvalu
 United States Department of State: Tuvalu
United States Embassy in Suva

 
Tuvalu
United States